The 2023 Peru Cup season, the largest amateur tournament of Peruvian football. The District Stage starts in 12 February, and the National Stage starts in November. The winner, runner-up and the semifinalists of the National Stage will be promoted to the Liga 2.

On 23 August 2022, it was announced that starting from 2023, the Copa Perú would only give promotion to Liga 2 due to the reforms of Peruvian football by the FPF, meaning that the 2022 Copa Perú edition was the last that awarded its winning team promotion to the Peruvian top flight.

Departmental stage
''Departmental Stage: 2023 Ligas Departamentales del Perú

The following list shows the teams that qualified for the National Stage.

National Stage
In 2023 the National Stage has grown to 50 teams, and the new National Stage, designed by matchVision, is played under Regional using the POT System, with all the Regions of Peru represented. The National Stage starts in the second week of September.

This phase features the 50 teams that qualified from the Departmental Stage. Each team plays 3 games at home and 3 games away, for a total of 6 games against 3 different geographical rivals. The departmental stage winners only play against departmental runners-up, and vice versa. All the teams are positioned in one general table. After 6 matches, the team in places 1 to 32 are qualified directly to the Round of 32. The teams in places 33 to 50 are eliminated.

The winner, runner-up and the semifinalists of the National Stage will be promoted to the Liga 2.

League table

Round 1

|-

|-
|}

Round 2

|-

|-
|}

Round 3

|-

|-
|}

Round 4

|-

|-
|}

Round 5

|-

|-
|}

Round 6

|-

|-
|}

Final Rounds

Round of 32

|-
|}

Round of 16

|-
|}

Quarterfinals

|-
|}

Semifinals

|-
|}

Finals 

|-
|}

See also
 2023 Liga 1
 2023 Liga 2
 2023 Ligas Departamentales del Perú

References

External links
 Official Website
  Dechalaca Copa Peru
  Semanario Pasión

2023
Peru
2023 in Peruvian football